The 17th Texas Infantry Regiment was a unit of volunteers recruited in Texas that fought in the Confederate States Army during the American Civil War. The regiment organized in March 1862 with West Point graduate Robert T. P. Allen as it first colonel. It spent its entire existence west of the Mississippi River in the Trans-Mississippi Department. After marching to Arkansas in August 1862, the regiment spent the winter at Camp Nelson where a large number of men died from disease. In fall 1862, the unit was assigned to the 3rd Brigade of the Texas infantry division later known as Walker's Greyhounds. The regiment fought at Milliken's Bend in June 1863. George Washington Jones assumed command of the regiment in November 1863. The unit was in action at Fort De Russy, Mansfield, Pleasant Hill, and Jenkins' Ferry in 1864. The regiment marched to Texas and surrendered in June 1865.

Notes

References

 

Units and formations of the Confederate States Army from Texas
1862 establishments in Texas
Military units and formations established in 1862
1865 disestablishments in Texas
Military units and formations disestablished in 1865